Sigma Phi Omega, also known as Sigmas, is an Asian American interest sorority founded at the University of Southern California in Los Angeles, California

History

Purpose
Sigma Phi Omega was founded at the University of Southern California in 1949, and is the oldest Asian American sorority at USC and UT Austin and third oldest Asian sorority in the United States. It was originally established as a social organization for Japanese and Japanese American women at USC and has since then come to consist of a diverse membership of women hailing from numerous racial and cultural backgrounds.

Early years
At its beginning, the founding mothers of Sigma Phi Omega were invited by Chi Alpha Delta, an Asian-American sorority from UCLA, to become one of their chapters. Chi Alpha Delta had been chartered in 1928 at UCLA, but was rendered inactive between 1942 and 1945 because the majority of its members were unable to attend UCLA due to World War II. After the end of the war, the sorority was reorganized in 1946.

However, the founding mothers decided to start their own organization. The Greek letters were chosen at random and were not used by any other existing College fraternities or sororities at that time. The Greek letters were, however, being used by a national high school fraternity. Although the Sigmas did not originate as a sorority, one could speculate that the choosing of Greek letters was a public way of voicing an unsatisfactory opinion about the treatment of Asian Americans, specifically Japanese Americans, by the campus and Greek organizations.

Founding Mothers

Philanthropy 
Sigma Phi Omega has chosen domestic violence awareness and prevention & Sexual Assault Awareness as its National Philanthropy. During the month of April each year, the chapters organize a week filled with seminars and fundraising events to bring awareness to their communities. Equally, throughout the month of October each year, all chapters of Sigma Phi Omega Sorority, Inc. organize a "SAFE (Stop Abuse For Everyone) WEEK" filled with seminars and discussions about domestic violence and fundraising events. Sigma Phi Omega works to educate college campuses and surrounding communities, specifically reaching out to Asian and Asian American women, in an effort to stop domestic violence and to raise awareness of sexual assault on college campuses.

While raising domestic violence awareness is Sigmas' main philanthropy, the chapters also sponsors and participate in AIDS walks, Habitat for Humanity, Canning for Hunger, Girls Inc., various shelters, clean cities programs, and more.

Many members of Sigma Phi Omega are also individually involved within their own community through tutoring and mentoring programs for the disadvantaged and younger students, as well as through various volunteering programs.

Service is one of the main pillars within the sisterhood of Sigma Phi Omega. By it they explain their pride in serving their communities and are inspired to contribute to make a difference in each other's lives and the lives of others.

Chapters 
Sigma Phi Omega has installed nine chapters located in California and Texas, nine of which are active. Active chapter noted in bold, inactive chapters noted in italics.

Conventions
There are annual conventions held each summer as well as Mid-year Retreat, where sisters from different chapters gather to bring orders of business as well as bond. These conventions and retreats are hosted by the chapters in rotations.

Affiliations
Cousin fraternity (Texas):
 Delta Epsilon Psi

External links
Official Website

References 

Student societies in the United States
1949 establishments in California